Herpetogramma maledicta is a moth in the family Crambidae. It was described by Warren in 1892. It is found on Pitcairn Island.

References

Moths described in 1892
Herpetogramma
Moths of Oceania